Richenza of Northeim (c. 1087/1089 – 10 June 1141) was Duchess of Saxony from 1106, Queen of Germany from 1125 and Holy Roman Empress from 1133 as the wife of Lothair of Supplinburg.

Family
She was the daughter of Count Henry the Fat of Northeim (d. 1101) and Gertrude of Brunswick, daughter of the Brunonid margrave Egbert I of Meissen. Around 1107 Richenza married Lothair of Supplinburg, recently enfeoffed with the Duchy of Saxony. 
Richenza's only surviving daughter with Lothair, Gertrude of Süpplingenburg, was born in 1115. In 1127 she married the Bavarian duke Henry the Proud (d. 1139), a member of the Welf dynasty.

Queen and empress 
After Lothair was elected King of the Romans in 1125, Richenza was crowned queen by Archbishop Frederick I of Cologne. Richenza took an active part in her husband's reign, which is reflected in her activities during the papal schism of 1130, and her role as intermediary between Lothair and his Hohenstaufen rivals, the proclaimed antiking Conrad III and his brother Duke Frederick II of Swabia. In 1132-33 she accompanied her husband to Italy. They were crowned emperor and empress by Pope Innocent II at the Lateran Basilica in Rome on 4 June 1133. She also took part in Lothair's second Italian expedition in 1136–37, whereby she presided over hearings of the Imperial court and issued several deeds.

Widowhood 

Lothair died in 1137, and Richenza moved swiftly to ensure the lands of Saxony went to her son-in-law, Duke Henry the Proud.  On Pentecost the following year, however, the Princes of the Holy Roman Empire convened in Bamberg to elect Conrad III King of the Romans. Conrad vested the Ascanian count Albert the Bear with Saxony and Henry died soon after, in the autumn of 1139. Richenza fought hard for the inheritance of her grandson Henry the Lion, seeing to his education, and pushing for his right to be regarded as the heir to the Saxon duchy. Young Henry was finally appointed Duke in 1142; his mother Gertrude ruled as regent until his majority.

Richenza however did not live to see her grandson succeed to the duchy. She died in 1141 and was buried next to her husband Emperor Lothair and her son-in-law Duke Henry the Proud in the Imperial Cathedral at Königslutter. Her grave goods included a simple and elegant lead crown.

References 
  genealogie-mittelalter.de

External links

1080s births
1141 deaths
Brunonids
Holy Roman Empresses
Duchesses of Saxony
House of Süpplinburger
12th-century German nobility
12th-century German women
Lothair III, Holy Roman Emperor